Airport 1975 (also known as Airport '75) is a 1974 American air disaster film and the first sequel to the successful 1970 film Airport. It was directed by Jack Smight, produced by William Frye, executive produced by Jennings Lang, and written by Don Ingalls. The film stars Charlton Heston, Karen Black, George Kennedy and Gloria Swansonas a fictionalized version of herselfin her final film role.

The plot concerns the dramatic events aboard an airborne Boeing 747 when a small aircraft crashes into the cockpit, causing the fatalities of senior crew and the blinding of the pilot, leaving no one aboard qualified to take the controls. Airport 1975 was the seventh highest-grossing movie of 1974 at the US and Canada box office.

Plot
Columbia Airlines Flight 409 is a Boeing 747-100 on a red-eye flight from Washington Dulles International Airport to Los Angeles International Airport, while Scott Freeman is a businessman flying his private Beechcraft Baron to a sales meeting in Boise, Idaho. However, an occluded front has the entire West Coast of the United States socked in, with Columbia 409 and Freeman's Beechcraft both diverted to Salt Lake City International Airport.

Salt Lake air traffic control assigns Columbia 409 to land ahead of Freeman's Beechcraft. As Columbia 409 is about to start its descent, First Officer Urias unlocks himself from his seat to check out a vibration. Just then, Freeman suffers a heart attack and uncontrollably ascends into the approach of Columbia 409.  The Beechcraft slams into Columbia 409 just above the co-pilot seat, ripping a hole through which Urias is ejected from the jet, while killing the flight engineer and sending debris that blinds the jet's pilot, Captain Stacy. Stacy is able to engage the autopilot and the altitude hold switch before losing consciousness. Nancy Pryor, the First Stewardess, rushes to the flight deck.

Nancy informs the Salt Lake control tower on the status of the cockpit crew, and that there is no one to fly the plane, while also giving an assessment of the damage. Joe Patroni, Columbia's Vice President of Operations, is apprised of Columbia 409's situation. He seeks the advice of Captain Al Murdock, Columbia's chief flight instructor, who also happens to be Nancy's boyfriend, though their relationship was "on the rocks" at that time.

Patroni and Murdock take the airline's executive jet to Salt Lake. En route, they communicate with Nancy, learning that the autopilot is keeping the aircraft in level flight, but it is inoperable for turns. The jet is heading into the mountains of the Wasatch Range, so Murdock starts to guide Nancy by radio on how to perform the turn when radio communications are interrupted and the Salt Lake tower is unable to restore contact.
 
Unable to turn, leaking fuel and dodging the mountain peaks, an air-to-air rescue attempt is undertaken from an HH-53 helicopter flown by the US Air Force Aerospace Rescue and Recovery Service. While a replacement pilot is preparing to be extended on a tether from the helicopter to Columbia 409, Stacy is able to give a cryptic clue regarding the decrease in airspeed during a climb in altitude. Nancy realizes that she must accelerate to be able to climb over the mountains and successfully does so. After Columbia 409 has leveled off, the replacement pilot is released towards the stricken airliner. Just as Nancy is helping him in, the release cord from his harness becomes caught in the jagged metal surrounding the hole in the cockpit. Before he can climb in, his harness is released from the tether and he falls from the aircraft.

The only other person on the helicopter who can land a 747 is Murdock. He is tethered to the helicopter, lowered to the jet, and successfully enters it through the hole in the cockpit. He then lands the plane safely at Salt Lake City International Airport. However, he is forced to make high speed taxiing maneuvers, as a drop in brake pressure hampers his efforts to stop. Once the plane stops, the flight attendants successfully conduct an emergency evacuation of the passengers via the evacuation slides, as Nancy and Murdock reconcile.

Cast

In addition, NFL player and future (1980, 1984) Super Bowl-winning quarterback Jim Plunkett has an uncredited cameo as himself.

Production

Airport 1975 used a Boeing 747-123 (s/n 20390.  Registration N9675), rented from American Airlines when it was temporarily taken out of passenger service at the start of American's restructuring away from the fleet of Boeing jumbo jets in mid-1974. The aircraft was leased to Trans Mediterranean Airways briefly in 1976, before returning and being converted into an "American Freighter" variant. In 1984, the aircraft was sold to UPS, where it continued to serve as a freighter for over 20 years before being retired to desert storage in 2005 (and scrapped in 2011).

The film was shot on location at Salt Lake City International Airport. Aerials shots over Heber City, Utah and the Wasatch Mountains are included.

As Sister Ruth, Helen Reddy performs a solo acoustic version of her song "Best Friend" (originally on her 1971 debut album I Don't Know How to Love Him) to an ailing Linda Blair. The song was written by Reddy and Ray Burton, who also co-wrote her hit single "I Am Woman".

Reception

Box office

Airport 1975 was  a massive commercial success. In its first week of release from 144 theatres, it grossed $2,737,995. With a budget of $3 million, the film grossed $47.3 million in the United States and Canada at the box office, making it the seventh highest-grossing film of 1974 and the year's third highest-grossing disaster film, behind The Towering Inferno and Earthquake. The film grossed $55.7 million internationally for a worldwide total of $103 million.

Critical reception 
Critical reception was mainly unfavorable, with The New Yorker magazine's film critic Pauline Kael calling the picture "cut-rate swill," "produced on a TV-movie budget by mercenary businessmen."  Kael also thought the audio problems gave Karen Black's voice a metallic sound that was grating and that the main character, a stewardess, was constantly being patronized by men. Roger Ebert was less condemnatory, awarding two-and-a-half stars out of four and describing it as "corny escapism," although he made a similar observation about Black's character - that she is made to seem incompetent simply because she is a woman. Gene Siskel also gave the film two-and-a-half stars out of four, calling the collision scene "both a surprise and well executed," but the scenes afterward "both implausible and dull." Vincent Canby of The New York Times called the film "silly" and suffering from "a total lack of awareness of how comic it is when it's attempting to be most serious." Kevin Thomas of the Los Angeles Times wrote "Whatever its flaws, 'Airport' generated plenty of suspense and was lots of fun; 'Airport 1975' is too much a rehash to seem anything but mechanical and finally silly in its predictability." Gary Arnold of The Washington Post stated, "It may get by at the box-office, but it's a hasty, superfluous job of formula moviemaking." David McGillivray of The Monthly Film Bulletin wrote that "despite a sterling performance from Karen Black, convincingly petrified as the stewardess expected to negotiate the plane through the mountains, the tension never coalesces." Airport 1975 currently holds a 33% rating on Rotten Tomatoes based on 18 reviews.

Airport 1975 was included in the book The Fifty Worst Films of All Time published in 1978. The film is listed in Golden Raspberry Award founder John J.B. Wilson's book The Official Razzie Movie Guide as one of The 100 Most Enjoyably Bad Movies Ever Made.

American Film Institute nominated the film in AFI's 100 Years... 100 Thrills.

Legacy
This is one among many of a class of disaster films that became a popular craze during the 1970s. Its plot devices and characterizations, including a singing nun (Helen Reddy), a former glamorous star (Gloria Swanson as herself), an alcoholic (Myrna Loy), a child in need of an organ transplant (Linda Blair) and a chatterbox (Sid Caesar) were parodied in 1980's Airplane! and on The Carol Burnett Show as "Disaster '75".

Award nomination

See also
 List of American films of 1974

References

Notes

Bibliography

 Heston, Charlton. In the Arena: An Autobiography. New York: Simon & Schuster, 1995. .
 Wilson, John. The Official Razzie Movie Guide: Enjoying the Best of Hollywood's Worst. New York: Grand Central Publishing, 2005. .

External links

 
 
 
 
 
 

1974 films
1970s action thriller films
1970s disaster films
Airport (film series)
American disaster films
American aviation films
Films about aviation accidents or incidents
Films set on airplanes
Films set in Salt Lake City
American sequel films
Universal Pictures films
Films shot in Salt Lake City
Films directed by Jack Smight
Films based on works by Arthur Hailey
Salt Lake City International Airport
1970s English-language films
1970s American films